Trinity Episcopal Church is a historic church at 409 North Liberty Street in Independence, Missouri.

It was built in 1881 in a Late Victorian style. The building was added to the National Register of Historic Places in 1979.

Future US President Harry S Truman married Bess Wallace at Trinity Episcopal on June 28, 1919. The church was also the site of the 1956 wedding of their daughter, Margaret.

References

Episcopal church buildings in Missouri
Churches on the National Register of Historic Places in Missouri
Victorian architecture in Missouri
Churches completed in 1881
1881 establishments in Missouri
Churches in Independence, Missouri
19th-century Episcopal church buildings
National Register of Historic Places in Jackson County, Missouri